The flying disc competition at the 2022 World Games took place in July 2022, in Birmingham, Alabama, USA, at John Carroll Catholic High School. Originally scheduled to take place in July 2021, the Games were rescheduled for July 2022 as a result of the 2020 Summer Olympics postponement due to the COVID-19 pandemic.

Qualification
A total of 8 teams competed in the flying disc event at the 2022 World Games.

The 2016 World Ultimate and Guts Championships acted as the qualification tournament. Eight best teams qualified for the World Games.

Qualified teams

Medal table

Medalists

References

External links
 The World Games 2022
 World Flying Disc Federation
 Results book

2022
2022 World Games